Jacques Marie Boudin de Tromelin, Chevalier de La Nuguy (Ploujean, 31 May 1751 — Norge, 4 December 1798) was a French Navy officer. He served in the Indian Ocean under Suffren during the War of American Independence. Tromelin Island is named after him.

Biography 
Born to Marie-Françoise Le Diouguel de Penanru and Jacques Boudin de Tromelin, Tromelin-Lanuguy joined the Navy as a Garde-Marine in Brest on 12 January 1766. He served in Bayonne and Saint-Malo.

From 1 November 1767 to 27 January 1768, he served on the 32-gun frigate Sensible, under Captain du Chaffault, for a cruise to the Caribbean. Sick, he was disembarked at Saint-Domingue and returned to Brest on a merchantman.

He then served as first officer on the cutter Lézard, under his older brother Tromelin-Launay, departing Lorient in October 1772 to arrive at Isle de France (Mauritius) in June 1773. He was promoted to Ensign on 1 October 1773.

Dauphine 
Tromelin-Lanuguy then served as first officer on Dauphine, taking part in Kerguelen's second expedition. After the return of the ships to Madagascar, he took command of Dauphine on 14 June 1774. On 29 November 1776, Dauphine rescued 7 women and an 8-month child, sole survivors of 160 slaves abandoned by the crew of a slave ship wrecked on "Isle aux Sables" (now Tromelin Island) on 27 September 1761, some 15 years earlier.

In August 1778, Tromelin-Lanuguy was appointed to the 22-gun fluyt Pintade, bound for France. He left Isle de France on 28 December 1778 and arrived at Lorient on 2 July 1779. On the way, he repelled an attack from a British privateer, which earned him the Cross of the Order of Saint Louis and a promotion to Lieutenant.

War of American Independence 
During the War of American Independence, Tromelin-Lanuguy served in the Indian Ocean in a squadron under Rear-Admiral Thomas d'Estienne d'Orves. He was commanding the corvette Sylphide when the squadron departed Isle de France on 7 December 1781. On 9 February 1782, Estienne d'Orves died and Suffren assumed command of the squadron. He re-appointed his captains and gave Tromelin-Lanuguy command of the corvette Subtile.

In March 1782, in the wake of the Battle of Sadras, Suffren transferred Tromelin-Lanuguy to Pourvoyeuse, replacing Lieutenant de Ruyter.  Tromelin-Lanuguy took part in the Battle of Providien on 12 April 1782.

In April 1782, Tromelin-Lanuguy escorted prizes captured by Bellone to Tharangambadi, and from there sailed to Malaca to procure supplies and spare parts.  On his journey back, he encountered five East Indiamen, resulting in the action of 10 September 1782 after which he withdrew. Upon his return, Tromelin-Lanuguy  suffered the scorn of Suffren, who blamed him for failing to press his attack on the East Indiamen. Suffren repeatedly accused Tromelin-Lanuguy oh "disgracing the flag", but when he offered to resign, Suffren refused. 

Tromelin-Lanuguy briefly commanded the 64-gun Saint-Michel from 18 May 1783 to 25 July, before returning to Pourvoyeuse.

Interwar 
On 12 January 1784, Tromelin-Lanuguy married Marie Charlotte Julie Martin. That year, he took command of Osterley.

He was promoted to Major de vaisseau on 1 May 1786.

French Revolution 
In 1790, Tromelin-Lanuguy requested a leave of absence from the Navy. He was then reported by a priest loyal to the Republic, and imprisoned. A friend convinced Jeanbon Saint-André to have him freed, and Tromelin-Lanuguy resigned from the Navy. He then requested permission to leave for Isle de France, but actually emigrated to join the Armée des Princes. The French Republic listed him as an émigré and his property was seized.

Tromelin-Lanuguy returned to France in 1797 before going to Copenhagen and embarking on the Danish East Indiaman Norge. He died aboard on 4 December 1798.

See also 
 Bernard-Marie Boudin de Tromelin (1735 — 1815), brother to Tromelin-Lanuguy
 Maurice Boudin de Tromelin de Launay (1740 — 1825), brother to Tromelin-Lanuguy

Sources and references 
 Notes

References

 Bibliography
 
 

French Navy officers